Senator Snow may refer to:

John J. Snow Jr. (born 1945), North Carolina State Senate
Karl N. Snow (born 1930), Utah State Senate
Leslie Perkins Snow (1862–1934), New Hampshire State Senate

See also
Olympia Snowe (born 1947), U.S. Senator from Maine from 1995 to 2013
Lois Snowe-Mello (1948–2016), Maine State Senate